The Glenlivet Estate is located in Glenlivet, Scotland in the Cairngorms National Park.  It measures  and is part of The Crown Estate. 
The estate welcomes visitors and has a network of car parks, waymarked walks, adventure playground and a mountain bike centre. A visitor centre in Tomintoul provides more information, open all year, Mon - Fri, 9am -5pm. www.glenlivetestate.co.uk.

See also
Scalan

External links

Glenlivet Estate
The Crown Estate    
Glenlivet and the Cairngorms

Moray
Highland Estates